1960–61 was the 15th season of the Western International Hockey League.

During the 1960–61 season, the WIHL played interlocking with the Okanagan Senior League. In January, during the middle of season, the Trail Smoke Eaters traveled to Europe for the 1961 World Ice Hockey Championships. The East Kootenay Rams, from Cranbrook, British Columbia were formed to replace them.

Standings

 Trail Smoke Eaters		34-4-0-68	255-117
 Nelson Maple Leafs		18-18-0-36	147-157
 Rossland Warriors		13-22-1-27	150-197
 East Kootenay Rams		2-15-1-5	54-127

Playoffs

Semi final (2 games total goals)
Game 1: Rossland 4 East Kootenay 3
Game 2: East Kootenay 4 Rossland 0
East Kootenay Rams beat Rossland Warriors 7 goals to 4 to win right to play the Nelson Maple Leafs.

Final (Best of 5)
Game 1: East Kootenay 4 Nelson 1
Game 2: Nelson 4 East Kootenay 2
Game 3: East Kootenay 6 Nelson 5
Game 4: Nelson 5 East Kootenay 2
Game 5: Nelson 5 East Kootenay 3

The Nelson Maple Leafs beat East Kootenay Rams 3 wins to 2.
The Nelson Maple Leafs advanced to the 1969-61 British Columbia Senior Playoffs.

References 

Spokane Daily Chronicle - 18 Feb 1960: Amateurs Ask for Ice Dates - Jets Want Word Before April 1
The Spokesman-Review - 30 Jun 1960: Ex-WIHL Prexy Dies
Spokane Daily Chronicle - 18 Feb 1960

Western International Hockey League seasons
Wihl
Wihl